This is a list of administrators and governors of Ekiti State. Ekiti State was created on 1 October 1996 from  territory of Ondo State.

See also
States of Nigeria
List of  Nigerian state governors

References

Ekiti
Governors